The following is a list of Chile national football team managers.

Managers
This is the statistical table of Chile national football team managers and all matches against National Teams.
* To obtain the performance percentage (%), it is considered 3 points for a win, 1 point for a draw and 0 points for a loss.
* Honours from friendly tournaments are shown in cursive.
* Coaches at the FIFA World Cup are shown in bold.

Notes

References

 
Chile
Football
Managers